The manga series Zetman by Masakazu Katsura was first a one-shot from a set of four published between 1989 and 1994 in Shueisha's Weekly Shōnen Jump magazine. Other one-shots compiled were "Shin-no-Shin", "Woman in the Man" and "Shadow Lady". Zetman started serialization as a full-fledged series in the seinen magazine Weekly Young Jump in 2002. The series temporarily ceased its publication, as the last chapter of its "Act 1" was published on July 24, 2014. As of October 2014, the serial chapters were collected into twenty tankōbon, the first one released on November 19, 2003, and the 20th one on October 17, 2014. Outside Japan, the series is licensed by Editorial Ivrea in Argentina, by Grupo Editorial Vid in Mexico, by Star Comics in Italy, by Glénat in Spain, and in France by Tonkam.

Volumes list

References

Zetman